Live a Little, Love a Little is a 1968 American musical comedy film starring Elvis Presley. It was directed by Norman Taurog, who had directed several previous Presley films. This was to be Taurog's final film, as he went blind shortly after production ended. Presley shares the screen with fellow legendary singing idol Rudy Vallee, whose career dated to the 1920s, but Vallee, in his late 60s, did not sing in the film.

The film introduced the song "A Little Less Conversation", an alternate take of which would form the basis of a remix that returned Presley to international music sales charts in 2002.

Plot
Greg Nolan (Presley) is a newspaper photographer who lives a carefree life until he encounters an eccentric, lovelorn woman named Bernice on the beach. Bernice assumes different names and personalities whenever the mood hits her. She introduces herself to Greg as "Alice" but she is known to the grocery delivery boy as "Susie" and to the milkman as "Betty."

After having her Great Dane dog Albert (which was reportedly Presley's real-life dog Brutus, though Priscilla Presley has stated that it was a trained dog used for the film) chase Greg into the water when he insults her after a kiss, Bernice invites him to stay at her beachfront home. Bernice later causes Greg to get fired from his job and get evicted from his apartment after drugging him, which leaves him in a deep sleep for days.

However, Bernice manages to find Greg another home. Greg wants to repay her, so he procures two full-time photographer jobs: one for a Playboy-like magazine owned by Mike Lansdown (Don Porter), and the other for a very conservative advertising firm co-owned by Mr. Penlow (Vallee). The two jobs are in the same building, forcing Greg to run from one to the other without being detected. Greg also deals with Bernice and her eccentric ways, and finally realizes he's fallen in love with her.

Cast

Background
Based on the 1965 novel Kiss My Firm, But Pliant, Lips by Dan Greenburg, and with a screenplay co-written by Greenburg, Live a Little, Love a Little was a departure from the standard Presley films of the period. It had a more mature tone than other Presley musicals, with strong language, drug references and an implied sexual encounter.

Presley was paid $850,000 plus 50% of the profits.

Unlike many previous films that involved "location scenes" shot against a backdrop, Presley appeared in more real location scenes than usual. Scenes were filmed in and around Hollywood, along the Malibu coast, at Marineland and at the Los Angeles Music Center.

The film co-starred Michele Carey, Don Porter, Rudy Vallee and Dick Sargent, and featured Presley's father Vernon in an uncredited cameo. Several of Presley's Memphis Mafia friends, such as Red West and Joe Esposito, also appeared.

Released on October 23, 1968, the film failed to impress most critics. With a very poor performance on its American release, the film was not released in many regions, including in the U.K.

Soundtrack
Live a Little, Love a Little, the second of Presley's five final movies during the 1960s, included just a handful of musical numbers. The recording session for the four songs written for the film took place at Western Recorders in Hollywood on March 7, 1968. The producer in nominal charge of the session, Billy Strange, was attuned to current trends in popular music and brought in a group of musicians outside of Presley's usual stable, offering written arrangements that strayed from Presley's usual sound. "Almost in Love" was given a late-night cocktail-jazz quality with more or less a Muzak feel, "Edge of Reality" was a piece of pseudo-acid rock and "A Little Less Conversation", written by Strange and his new discovery Mac Davis, bordered on funk.

"A Little Less Conversation" was released as a single with "Almost in Love" on the reverse side on September 3, 1968, RCA catalog nr. 47–9610. It peaked at No. 69, while its B-side scraped into the Billboard Hot 100 at No. 95 independently. Over three decades later, a remix of "A Little Less Conversation" became a global No. 1 hit record, although the version sourced for the remix was actually a later re-recording made for the soundtrack of Presley's 1968 NBC comeback special, and not the movie version. "Edge of Reality" appeared on November 5, 1968, as the B-side of RCA single 47-9670 "If I Can Dream," the song Presley used to close out his 1968 Christmas Special. "Wonderful World," which played over the opening credits to the film, appeared on the compilation Elvis Sings Flaming Star. All three tracks released on singles also appear on Command Performances: The Essential 60's Masters II.

Track listing
 "Wonderful World" (Doug Flett, Guy Fletcher)
 "Edge of Reality" (Bernie Baum, Bill Giant, Florence Kaye)
 "A Little Less Conversation" (Billy Strange, Mac Davis)
 "Almost in Love" (Luiz Bonfá, Randy Starr)

Personnel
 Elvis Presley – vocals
 B. J. Baker, Sally Stevens, Bob Tebow, John Bahler – backing vocals
 Joseph Gibbons – electric guitar
 Neil Levang – electric guitar
 Alvin Casey – electric guitar
 Charles Britz – electric guitar
 Don Randi – piano
 Charles Berghofer – bass
 Larry Knechtel – bass
 Hal Blaine – drums
 Gary Coleman – drums

Quotes
Celeste Yarnall, who played Ellen, recalled the making of the film and her impressions of Presley:

Reception
Variety called the film one of Presley's "dimmest vehicles," writing that Taurog's direction "tried to give some lilt to the proceedings. Nothing, however, can buck that writing. Songs are dull, physical values are standard, and mediocrity prevails."

Kevin Thomas of the Los Angeles Times called the film "a pleasant Elvis Presley picture that's rather more sophisticated than the durable singing star's 27 prior efforts."

The Monthly Film Bulletin, reviewing the film in 1978, wrote that it "commendably attempts to create a more eccentric, 'sophisticated' setting for Presley than hitherto," but that it "fails to achieve the kind of comic invention vital to a screwball romantic comedy," and that its songs were "unmemorable."

Home media
Live a Little, Love a Little was released by Warner Home Video on August 7, 2007, as a Region 1 widescreen DVD.

See also
 List of American films of 1968

References

External links
 
 
 
 
 
 DVD Talk Review

1968 films
1968 musical comedy films
1968 romantic comedy films
American musical comedy films
American romantic comedy films
American romantic musical films
Films based on American novels
Films directed by Norman Taurog
Films shot in Los Angeles
Metro-Goldwyn-Mayer films
1960s English-language films
1960s American films